Denny Zimmerman (born December 14, 1940, Glastonbury, Connecticut), is a retired American racing driver. Zimmerman raced in the USAC Champ Car series from 1968 to 1972 with 16 career starts, including the 1971 and 1972 Indianapolis 500.  Of those starts, his only top ten finish was the 1971 Indianapolis 500, where he finished 8th and was named Rookie of the Year.

Career award
He was inducted in the New England Auto Racers Hall of Fame in 2000.

Indy 500 results

Notes

1940 births
Racing drivers from Connecticut
Living people
Indianapolis 500 drivers
Indianapolis 500 Rookies of the Year
People from Glastonbury, Connecticut